The Best of the Spinners is a 1978 greatest hits album from Philly soul vocal group The Spinners, released on Atlantic Records.

Recording and release
This is the second domestic Spinners compilation (after a 1977 British compilation, Smash Hits) and includes recordings from a series of successful albums produced by Thom Bell for Atlantic Records in the 1970s. A previous compilation by the same name from 1973 collects the group's first singles and tracks from their two Motown albums. By 1977, vocalist Philippé Wynne left the group for a solo career and to work in the music business, leading to a commercial decline for the group and a pair of less successful albums in 1977. This compilation came at the end of their collaboration with Bell: they would record the 1979 release From Here to Eternally with him, as well as a few tracks for his film The Fish That Saved Pittsburgh, but the group enlisted a different producer for their disco release Dancin' and Lovin' later that year.

Reception
The editors of AllMusic Guide scored this compilation 4.5 out of five stars, with reviewer Ron Wynn calling this "a definitive work" until Atlantic released a two-disc set in the compact disc era.

Track listing
"I'll Be Around" – 3:10
"How Could I Let You Get Away" – 3:45
"One of a Kind (Love Affair)" – 3:19
"Mighty Love" – 4:56
"Ghetto Child" – 3:47
"Then Came You" – 3:57
"Sadie" – 3:30
"Could It Be I'm Falling in Love" – 4:12
"They Just Can't Stop It The (Games People Play)" – 3:28
"The Rubberband Man" – 3:32

Chart performance
The Best of the Spinners reached 56 on the R&B chart and peaked at 115 on the Billboard 200.

See also
List of 1978 albums

References

External links

1978 greatest hits albums
Albums produced by Thom Bell
Atlantic Records compilation albums
The Spinners (American group) compilation albums